The George Meany-Lane Kirkland Human Rights Award is an award offered annually by AFL–CIO, and bears the name of the first two presidents of the entity. The award recognizes people and entities that fight for human rights in the field of labor relations.

Grantees 
 2000 – Luis Eduardo Garzon
 2001 – U Maung Maung
 2002 – Nancy Riche
 2003 – Wellington Chibebe
 2004 – Mikhail Volynets
 2005 – Ela Bhatt
 2006 – International Federation of Journalists
 2007 – Firestone Agricultural Workers Union of Liberia 
 2008 – Yessika Hoyos 
 2009 – Workers Movement of Egypt
 2011 – Napoleón Gómez Urrutia
 2012 – Arab Spring workers
 2013 – International Domestic Workers Network
 2014 – Building and Wood Workers’ International
 2015 – Trade Union Confederation of Swaziland
 2016 – Maina Kiai
 2017 – Han Sang-gyun
 2018 – National Temporary Protected Status Alliance
 2019 – Lula

References

External links 
George Meany-Lane Kirkland Human Rights Award

Human rights awards
Humanitarian and service awards